Simork Football Club (Thai สโมสรฟุตบอลสีหมอก), is a Thai semi professional football club based in Suphan Buri. The club was formed in 2015 and entered the Regional League Division 2 and allocated into the Western Division from Derby match province project. This team is the Reserve team of Suphanburi F.C.

Stadium and locations

Season By Season record

References
 http://www.kondivision2.com/content.php?id=6202

External links
 https://www.facebook.com/simorkfc

Association football clubs established in 2010
Football clubs in Thailand
Ubon Ratchathani province
2010 establishments in Thailand